The SIAI Savoia S.9 was an Italian reconnaissance flying boat, manufactured by Societa Idrovolanti Alta Italia (S.I.A.I.) from 1918. The wing structure was unusual by being a single-bay biplane wing, with additional struts mounted mid-bay at the junction of the flying and landing wires, so that it appeared to have a two-bay wing. The S.9 was also licence-built in France by CAMS (Chantiers Aéro-Maritimes de la Seine) as the CAMS C.9.

Operators

Finnish Air Force

Corpo Aeronautico Militare
Regia Aeronautica

Specifications (S.9)

References

Further reading

 

S.09
1920s Italian military reconnaissance aircraft
Biplanes
Flying boats
Single-engined pusher aircraft
Aircraft first flown in 1918